Wycliffe is a small community in British Columbia, Canada. It is located between Cranbrook and Kimberley on the Kimberley Highway. 6 mile lane is not a part of Wycliffe, as it is considered to be in the Perry Creek Community.

Notable residents
Frank Stojack, National Football League player
Dustin Nielson, TSN Radio Host, Sports Broadcaster

Designated places in British Columbia
Settlements in British Columbia